Caloptilia phiaropis is a moth of the family Gracillariidae. It is known from Peru.

References

phiaropis
Moths of South America
Moths described in 1921